Gorin is an former air base in Khabarovsk Krai, Russia located 75 km northwest of Komsomolsk-na-Amure.  It contained a 1 km long remote ramp on the north side.  A noteworthy major, but remote airfield.  It may have been intended for dispersion of intermediate-range bombers during a Sino-Soviet conflict.

References

Soviet Air Force bases